Chinaroot, china-root, or china root may refer to:

 Smilax glabra, the traditional medicinal chinaroot
 Smilax china, a related climbing plant also known as chinaroot

See also
 Smilax pseudochina, the false chinaroot
 Smilax, the larger genus
 Syphilis, a major disease previously treated with chinaroot